United Nations Security Council Resolution 1781 was unanimously adopted on 15 October 2007. The resolution extended the mandate of the United Nations Observer Mission in Georgia (UNOMIG), which was to expire 15 October 2007, the day of the vote, until 15 April 2008. Furthermore, it "strongly urges all parties to consider and address seriously each other’s legitimate security concerns, to refrain from any acts of violence and provocation, including political action or rhetoric, and to comply fully with previous agreements regarding ceasefire and non-use of violence."

References

External links
Text of the Resolution at undocs.org

 1781
 1781
October 2007 events
2007 in Georgia (country)